Artūras Zuokas (born 21 February 1968) is a Lithuanian politician. He is the Chairman of the political party Lithuanian Freedom Union. He was the Mayor of Vilnius from 2000 to 2007 and again from 2011 to 2015. From 2008 to 2009 he was a member of the Seimas (Lithuanian Parliament).

Zuokas graduated from the first secondary school in Jonava. He then worked as an independent reporter for Independent Television News as a war reporter in Iraq, where he taped the bombing of the Baghdad TV Tower during the First Gulf War. In August 1991, he brought recently captured footage from the site of the Medininkai massacre to the official meeting between the president of the United States, George H. W. Bush, and Soviet Union president Mikhail Gorbachev in Moscow, which caused concern from the American side about the use of force against freedom-seeking nations.

Election as Mayor, 2000
Artūras Zuokas was one of the campaign managers for the Liberal Union of Lithuania in the 2000 Seimas elections. His party placed second, winning 36 seats. It formed an alliance with the New Union (Socialliberals) and Rolandas Paksas (the leader of the Liberal Union and Vilnius city municipality mayor, became the Prime Minister). There were two candidates from the Liberal Union for the vacant mayor's post: vice-mayor Algirdas Kudzys, and Zuokas. On 15 November 2000, the council voted 27–18 to make Zuokas, aged 32, the youngest mayor in the history of Vilnius.

Election as Mayor, 2011
In March 2010, Zuokas expressed his willingness to become the mayor of Kaunas, the second-largest city in Lithuania, but only if Lithuania would introduce direct elections.

Before the municipal election of 2011, famous English actor Jeremy Irons expressed his support for Artūras Zuokas and invited people to vote for him in a short video about his experience in Vilnius.

After a successful 2011 municipal election campaign in February, Zuokas once again became Mayor of Vilnius as his party won the most votes and gained 12 seats in the 51-seat Vilnius city council.

Allegations of corruption

 VEKS 2009 cultural events cost nearly 300 million LTL, way more than what was spent by Riga, Latvia with 24 million EUR and more than any other city. Preparation project was led by Artūras Zuokas and it was characterized by lack of transparency, surprising expenses and inflated prices.
 In 2009, Zuokas was convicted for organising the bribery of a fellow politician in 2003. After paying the fine of 12500 LTL, criminal record was later removed.
 According to a national survey from 2007, Zuokas is viewed as one of the three most corrupt Lithuanian politicians of all time

Awards and honors
Zuokas is the recipient of numerous international and national awards and honors.  He was decorated by President Jacques Chirac of France in 2001 with the National Order of Merit, and by President Vaira Vike-Freiberga of Latvia for his contribution to the betterment of bi-lateral relations.

He was twice elected vice-president of the Organization of World Heritage Cities. The Junior Chamber International recognized Zuokas for his administrative achievements by naming him one of the "Ten Outstanding Young Persons in the World" in 2002. The U.S. Baltic Foundation honored his achievements in 2003 and the Balzekas Museum in Chicago, Illinois named him "Man of the Year". Local awards have included "Friend of Architects". He is a three-time recipient of the popular Vilnius "Iron Wolf" award.

In 2003, Zuokas was bestowed with an honorary degree from the Gediminas Technical University.

In August 2011 Zuokas raised attention to illegal parking in bike lanes by staging the destruction of an illegally parked car by a BTR-60 armoured personnel carrier in a Vilnius bike lane running along Gediminas Avenue. The stunt was performed in cooperation with a bucket-list show aired on Swedish TV6, and the hosts Erik Ekstrand and Mackan Edlund sat in the back of the armored vehicle. Later that year he was awarded an Ig Nobel Peace Prize for "demonstrating that the problem of illegally parked luxury cars can be solved by running over them with a tank".

References

External links
 Blog of Artūras Zuokas 

1968 births
Living people
Mayors of Vilnius
Politicians from Jonava
Liberal and Centre Union politicians
Freedom and Justice politicians
Members of the Seimas
Journalists from Vilnius
Businesspeople from Vilnius
21st-century Lithuanian politicians